Joanna of Aragon (1479–1555), historically known as Joanna the Mad, was the nominal Queen of Castile and of Aragon.

Joanna, Joan or Juana of Aragon may also refer to:

Infantas of Aragon
 Joanna of Aragon, Countess of Ampurias (1344–1385), daughter of Peter IV of Aragon, married John I, Count of Ampurias 
 Joanna of Aragon, Countess of Foix (1375–1407), daughter of John I of Aragon, married Matthew of Foix
 Joanna of Aragon, Queen of Naples (1454–1517), daughter of John II of Aragon, married Ferdinand I of Naples
 Joanna of Naples (1478–1518) (1478–1518), daughter of Ferdinand I of Naples, married Ferdinand II of Naples

Other
 Juana Enríquez, wife of John II of Aragon

See also
Giovanna d'Aragona, Duchess of Amalfi (1478–1510), whose life inspired John Webster's play The Duchess of Malfi
Giovanna d'Aragona (1502–1575), patron of the arts, printers and religious reform in Naples during the Renaissance
Joanna of Naples (disambiguation)